Ronald Ellis Canada (born May 3, 1949) is an American actor with a specialty in portraying judges and detectives. He is best known for One on One (2001–2004), The Shield (2003–2004), and Lone Star (1996).

Career 

Following completion of the Michele Clark broadcast journalism program at Columbia University, under the guidance of producer Fred Friendly, Canada commenced his career as a television news reporter in 1971 at WBAL-TV. In 1974, he began his three-year tenure at WJLA-TV in Washington, D.C. For his work in the nation's capital, Canada was nominated twice for Regional Emmy Awards, receiving the award in 1977. The following year he received an A.P. Award for Outstanding Reporting.

He began his acting career in 1978. While making the career transition he worked part-time as a broadcaster for The Voice of America (U.S. Information Agency). He studied acting at The Folger Theatre Group under the tutelage of Franchelle Stewart Dorn. He moved from D.C. to New York in 1985. Shortly thereafter he became the second actor to play the role of 'Troy Maxson' in August Wilson's Fences at The GeVa Theatre in Rochester, New York (January 1986).

Canada has had a long career in both television and film, known primarily for his work in Cinderella Man, Wedding Crashers,  and his recurring role as Under Secretary of State Ted Barrow on The West Wing.  In 1996, Ron received the Dallas Film Critics Award and significant national attention for his performance as "Otis Payne" in John Sayles's film Lone Star.

He played the role of Iago in a "photo negative" version of Shakespeare's Othello at the Shakespeare Theatre Company in Washington, D.C. Other notable stage credits include his role as Emmet Tate in Zooman and The Sign at New York's Signature Theatre and originating the role of Duncan Troy in Headstrong at The Ensemble Studio Theatre, which earned him an Audelco Award nomination as Best Supporting Actor.
Off Broadway - In Old Age - playing Azell Abernathy, at New York Theatre Workshop, N.Y.C   
Broadway play - Network - with Bryan Cranston, Tony Goldwyn, and Tatiana Maslany. Mr.Canada portrayed UBS network chieftain Edward George Ruddy.

Filmography

Film

Television

Commercials

Radio

Video games

References

External links 

1949 births
Living people
Male actors from New York City
American male stage actors
American male film actors
American male television actors
American television news anchors
African-American male actors
21st-century African-American people
20th-century African-American people
20th-century American male actors
21st-century American male actors